Hamdollah Ebdam is an Iranian football midfielder who plays for Esteghlal Khuzestan in the Iran Pro League.

Club career
Rabbani started his career with Esteghlal Khuzestan from youth levels. He was promoted to the first team in summer 2014 while he signed a three-year contract. He made his debut for Esteghlal Khuzestan on November 7, 2014, against Saipa as a starter.

Club career statistics

Honours 
Esteghlal Khuzestan
Iran Pro League (1): 2015–16
Iranian Super Cup runner-up: 2016

References

External links
 Hamdollah Ebdam at PersianLeague.com
 Hamdollah Ebdam at IranLeague.ir

1993 births
Living people
Iranian footballers
Esteghlal Khuzestan players
Sportspeople from Khuzestan province
Association football midfielders